Mary Lambie may refer to:
 Mary Lambie (nurse) (1889–1971), New Zealand nurse and nursing educator
 Mary Lambie (broadcaster), New Zealand media personality and journalist